The 1966 Nigerian coup d'état began on 15 January 1966, when mutinous Nigerian soldiers led by Chukwuma Kaduna Nzeogwu and Emmanuel Ifeajuna killed 22 people including the Prime Minister of Nigeria, many senior politicians, many senior Army officers and their wives, and sentinels on protective duty. The coup plotters attacked the cities of Kaduna, Ibadan, and Lagos while also blockading the Niger and Benue River within a two-day span of time before the coup plotters were subdued. The General Officer Commanding the Nigerian Army, Johnson Aguiyi-Ironsi, was compelled to take control of the government of a country in upheaval, inadvertently putting Nigeria's nascent democracy on hold. His ascendancy to power was deemed a conspiracy by the coup plotters, who were mainly Igbo officers, to pave the way for General Aguiyi-Ironsi to be Head of State of Nigeria. Consequently, the retaliatory events by Northern members of the Nigerian Army that led to deaths of many innocent Igbo soldiers and civilians caused the Nigerian Civil War.

Background

In August 1965 a group of Army majors (Emmanuel Ifeajuna, Timothy Onwuatuegwu, Chris Anuforo, Don Okafor, Humphrey Chukwuka, and Adewale Ademoyega) began plotting a coup d'état against incumbent Prime Minister Abubakar Balewa. The coup was planned because according to the majors, the men at the helm of affairs were running Nigeria aground with their corrupt ways. Ministers under them were living flamboyant lifestyles and looting public funds at the expense of ordinary citizens.

The president of Nigeria, Nnamdi Azikiwe left the country in late 1965, first for Europe, then on a cruise to the Caribbean. Under the law, the Senate president, Nwafor Orizu, became acting president during his absence and assumed all the powers of the office.

Coup

In the morning of 15 January 1966, at a meeting with some local journalists in Kaduna seeking to find out what was going on, it was brought to Major Nzeogwu's attention that the only information about the events then was what was being broadcast by the BBC. Nzeogwu was surprised because he had expected a radio broadcast of the rebels from Lagos. He is said to have "gone wild" when he learnt that Emmanuel Ifeajuna in Lagos had not made any plans whatsoever to neutralize Johnson Aguiyi-Ironsi who was the Commander of the Army. Therefore, Nzeogwu hurriedly drafted a speech which was broadcast on Radio Kaduna sometime around 12 a.m. and in which he declared martial law over the Northern Provinces of Nigeria.

Aftermath
Acting President Nwafor Orizu made a nationwide broadcast, after he had briefed President Nnamdi Azikiwe on the phone about the decision of the cabinet, announcing the cabinet's "voluntary" decision to transfer power to the armed forces. Major General Johnson Aguiyi-Ironsi then made his own broadcast, accepting the "invitation". 
On 17 January, Major General Ironsi established the Supreme Military Council in Lagos and effectively suspended the constitution.

Casualties
Regarding the casualties, the coup conspirators claimed their purge post-coup targeted members or supporters of the anterior regime and had been targeted for purely political reasons instead of being a racial purge focused on certain ethnic groups or clans; furthermore, they also claimed the list of people targeted was small and composed of only 8 people, half of them foreigners who were to be arrested not killed, and that the casualties had occurred as collateral damage of the coup. These claims were clarified by a member of the trio that formed the coup, Adewale Ademoyega, who published them in Nigeria in 1981 in a book titled Why We Struck outlining their reasons and motivations in which he mentioned: 

Below is a comprehensive list of casualties from the coup.

Civilians
 Prime Minister Abubakar Tafawa Balewa
 Premier Ahmadu Bello
 Premier Samuel Ladoke Akintola
 Finance Minister Festus Okotie-Eboh
 Ahmed Ben Musa (Bello's Senior Assistant Secretary for Security)
 Hafsatu Bello
 Mrs Latifat Ademulegun
 Zarumi Sardauna
 Ahmed Pategi (Bello's driver)

Military and police
 Brig. Samuel Ademulegun
 Brig. Zakariya Maimalari
 Col. Ralph Shodeinde 
 Col. Kur Mohammed 
 Lt. Col. Abogo Largema
 Lt. Col. James Pam
 Lt. Col. Arthur Unegbe
 Sergeant Daramola Oyegoke (assisted Nzeogwu in the attack on the Sardauna's lodge and according to the police report was murdered by Nzeogwu)
 PC Yohana Garkawa
 Lance Corporal Musa Nimzo
 PC Akpan Anduka
 PC Hagai Lai
 Philip Lewande

References

 
 
 
 
 

Military coups in Nigeria
1966 in Nigeria
Nigerian Civil War
1960s coups d'état and coup attempts
History of Nigeria
January 1966 events in Africa
Conflicts in 1966